The 1964 Tasmanian state election was held on 2 May 1964.

Retiring Members

Labor
Frank Gaha MHA (Denison)

Liberal
Carrol Bramich MHA (Braddon)

House of Assembly
Sitting members are shown in bold text. Tickets that elected at least one MHA are highlighted in the relevant colour. Successful candidates are indicated by an asterisk (*).

Bass
Seven seats were up for election. The Labor Party was defending three seats. The Liberal Party was defending three seats. The seventh seat had been won in 1959 by independent candidate Reg Turnbull, but a recount conducted following Turnbull's resignation in 1961 had elected a Labor candidate.

Braddon
Seven seats were up for election. The Labor Party was defending four seats. The Liberal Party was defending three seats.

Denison
Seven seats were up for election. The Labor Party was defending three seats. The Liberal Party was defending three seats. Labor MHA Charley Aylett and Liberal MHA Bill Hodgman, however, were running as independents. Independent Bill Wedd was also defending a seat.

Franklin
Seven seats were up for election. The Labor Party was defending three seats. The Liberal Party was defending four seats, although Liberal MHA Tim Jackson was running as an independent.

Wilmot
Seven seats were up for election. The Labor Party was defending four seats. The Liberal Party was defending three seats.

See also
 Members of the Tasmanian House of Assembly, 1959–1964
 Members of the Tasmanian House of Assembly, 1964–1969

References
Tasmanian Parliamentary Library

Candidates for Tasmanian state elections